The Committee on European Union Affairs (also called EU-nämnden) is a governmental body in the Swedish Riksdag, where the Riksdag and the Swedish Government consult matters and issues about the European Union (EU). In the EU Committee, Sweden's negotiating position is determined prior to a meeting between the European Council and the Council of the European Union.

The Speaker of the committee is currently Hans Wallmark from the Moderate Party, along with vice-Speaker Matilda Ernkrans from the Social Democrats.

History 
In June 1994, a proposal was adopted in the Riksdag for forms of co-operation between the Riksdag and the Government on EU issues, among other things, a proposal for a principle was adopted on the establishment of the EU Committee. Later that year, the Riksdag's position with EU issues and the EU Committee's tasks was regulated by a Riksdag decision:

In addition to the established EU Committee, the Constitutional Inquiry, before the EU, discussed the possibility that the consultation would take place in the Foreign Affairs Committee or in other Riksdag committees. As the EU issues only apply in certain cases and have little to do with traditional foreign policy, the proposal was rejected by the Foreign Affairs Committee. If the consultation were to take place in the committees, there was a risk that the workload would be too great and that the Riksdag's overview of EU policy would suffer. The government would also find it difficult to have a large number of committees to consult with. The Constitutional Inquiry also stated that the overall influence would be greater if the Riksdag's consultations were coordinated through a spokesperson instead of through the respective committees. The EU Committee was set up with a clear role model in the Danish Folketinget's Marketing Committee (Markedsudvalget), a special committee for consideration and anchoring of EU related issues. The Marketing Committee has been considered to have a strong influence on the formulation of EU policy in Denmark.

Speakers and vice-speakers of the committee

List of speakers for the committee

List of vice-speakers for the committee

Working methods of the committee 
The Committee on European Union Affairs currently has 17 members. In the current term (2018–2022), the Social Democrats have five members, the Moderates four, the Sweden Democrats three, and other parties such as the Green Party, the Center Party, the Left Party, the Liberals and the Christian Democrats all have one member each. The EU Committee has more alternates than in the “ordinary” professional committees (41 of them as of 7 September 2011). The parties try to cover the committees most affected by EU issues with the appointments of members and alternates.

The Committee usually meets with the government on Fridays based on the agenda items that come up at the Council of Ministers' meetings the following week. It is often difficult to know exactly which issues will be the subject of negotiations in the Council of Ministers, as the preparations in COREPER conclude shortly before the meeting and it is only then that points being raised at the Council of Ministers are made known. Normally, the responsible minister (or state secretary) reports back from the previous cabinet meeting and then goes through the agenda for next week's meeting. In the following, the members can then discuss with the government the Swedish position proposed by the government on the issue. The members or parties that do not share the government's view on the issue are expected to clarify this. According to practice, it is in the EU committee that Sweden's negotiating position is determined. The Speaker of the Committee concludes each consultation point by stating whether there is a majority for the government's position on the issue or not.

The EU Committee's political mandate 
The material for consultations mainly consists of annotated Prime Minister memoranda where prioritised agenda items are commented on. The material must contain, among other things, information about the meaning of the questions and how Swedish rules and statutes are affected, any amendments by the European Parliament and the commission's position on the issue, and the openly stated positions of Member States. The government's proposal for a Swedish negotiating position must also be clarified.

Prior to EC membership and even after one and a half years of Swedish membership, the Constitutional Committee expressed what can be described as an established practice, namely that:

Praxis is further developed and due to the Riksdag Board's proposal "The Riksdag for the 2000s", the Constitutional Committee submitted a report in 2001 which affirms sharper writing of the Government's commitment to the EU Committee's views.

The Constitutional Committee states in another report the same year that there must be very good reasons for the government not to represent the committee's position. The EU Committee's advice and views can thus be said to be politically, but not legally, binding.

New system for dealing with EU issues in the Riksdag 
In an SOU report from 2002, political scientists Shirin Ahlbäck Öberg and Ann-Cathrin Jungar believe that Finnish parliamentarians are more involved in EU issues and experience parliament's power as greater than Swedish parliamentarians do. The authors say that in general, the difference between the parliaments seems to be explained in different constitutional solutions.
In Finland, the committees have been much more active in EU issues and often submitted opinions to the Grand Committee, (the Finnish equivalent of the EU-Committee) the equivalent of the EU Committee.

There is a desire from the Riksdag and the EU Committee to enter the EU decision-making process earlier, as otherwise there may be a risk that the Riksdag's overall influence over EU policy will suffer. The same applies to the information prior to the meetings of the EU Board, which arrives late due to the work rhythm, and which was perceived by the members, not least in the Board's early years, as deficient. Furthermore, the members of the EU Committee must deal with issues from widely differing policy areas; even though the members are often experienced parliamentarians, the government usually has a head start in terms of expertise.

The Riksdag Committee has an ongoing task to evaluate the Riksdag's decision from 2001 on the Riksdag's handling of EU issues and to

References

Notes

Sources 

 Hegeland, Hans 1999. Riksdagen, Europeiska unionen och demokratin. En studie av riksdagens arbete med EU-frågor, Statsvetenskapliga institutionen, Lunds universitet.
 Lindgren, Karl-Oskar 1999. EU-politiken i riksdagen: Om EU-medlemskapets betydelse för den svenska parliamentarismen, Statsvetenskapliga institutionen, Uppsala.
 SOU 2002:81, Ahlbäck Öberg, Shirin och Jungar, Ann-Cathrin. Parlament i bakvatten?
 Ursprungsversionen av denna artikel är en bearbetning av en uppsats skriven vid Statsvetenskapliga institutionen i Uppsala:
 Danielsson, Joacim 2004. Konflikt eller samsyn i EU-frågor? - om konfliktnivån i samråden mellan EU-nämnden och regeringen.

External links 
EU-nämnden

Committees of the Riksdag